Sağın is a village in the Karakoçan District of Elazığ Province in Turkey. Its population is 173 (2021). The village is populated by Kurds.

References

Villages in Karakoçan District